The Europe Zone was one of the two regional zones of the 1951 Davis Cup.

21 teams entered the Europe Zone, with the winner going on to compete in the Inter-Zonal Final against the winner of the America Zone. A seeding system was introduced for the first time, where the previous year's quarterfinalists were guaranteed a bye in the first round.

Sweden defeated West Germany in the final, and went on to face the United States in the Inter-Zonal Final.

Draw

First round

Finland vs. Brazil

Netherlands vs. Monaco

Norway vs. Egypt

Yugoslavia vs. West Germany

Switzerland vs. Luxembourg

Second round

Austria vs. Sweden

Great Britain vs. France

Philippines vs. Brazil

Netherlands vs. Ireland

Belgium vs. Egypt

West Germany vs. Denmark

Switzerland vs. Poland

Italy vs. South Africa

Quarterfinals

Great Britain vs. Sweden

Netherlands vs. Philippines

West Germany vs. Belgium

Italy vs. Poland

Semifinals

Sweden vs. Philippines

West Germany vs. Italy

Final

Sweden vs. West Germany

References

External links
Davis Cup official website

Davis Cup Europe/Africa Zone
Europe Zone
Davis Cup